Walter Gilbey was an English wine merchant.

Walter Gilbey may also refer to:

Walter Gilbey (politician) (born 1935), British politician and entrepreneur
Sir Walter Gilbey, 2nd Baronet (1859–1945), of the Gilbey baronets
Sir Walter Derek Gilbey, Baronet (1913–1991), of the Gilbey baronets
Sir Walter Gavin Gilbey, Baronet (born 1949), of the Gilbey baronets

See also
Gilbey (surname)